Hapkido (also spelled hap ki do or hapki-do; from Korean 합기도 hapgido ) is a hybrid Korean martial art. It is a form of self-defense that employs joint locks, grappling, throwing techniques, kicks, punches, and other striking attacks. It also teaches the use of traditional weapons, including knife, sword, rope, nunchaku (ssang juhl bong), cane (ji pang ee), short stick (dan bong), and middle-length staff (joong bong), gun (analogous to the Japanese jō), and bō (Japanese), which vary in emphasis depending on the particular tradition examined.

Hapkido employs both long-range and close-range fighting techniques, utilizing jumping kicks and percussive hand strikes at longer ranges, and pressure point strikes, joint locks, and throws at closer fighting distances. Hapkido emphasizes circular motion, redirection of force, and control of the opponent. Practitioners seek to gain advantage over their opponents through footwork and body positioning to incorporate the use of leverage, avoiding the use of brute strength against brute strength.

The art was adapted from Daitō-ryū Aiki-jūjutsu as it was taught by Choi Yong-Sool (최용술) when he returned to Korea after World War II after having lived in Japan for 30 years. This system was later combined by Choi's disciples with kicking and striking techniques of indigenous and contemporary arts such as Taekkyon, and Tang Soo Do; as well as various throwing techniques and ground fighting from Japanese Judo.

Name 
This is similar to how the Japanese aikido was written in Kyūjitai in the pre-1946 period. Currently, though, the second character is preferably written in Japanese in Shinjitai substituting the earlier, more complex 氣 with the modern, simplified .

In Hanja, the character  hap means "coordinated", "joining", or "harmony";  ki literally means air, gas or breath but is used to mean spirit or so-called 'internal energy'; and  do means "way" or "art", yielding a literal translation of "joining-energy-way". It is most often translated as "the way of coordinating energy", "the way of coordinated power", or "the way of harmony".

Although Japanese aikido and Korean hapkido share common technical origins, in time they have become separate and distinct from one another. They differ significantly in philosophy, range of responses, and manner of executing techniques. The fact that they share the same Japanese technical ancestry represented by their respective founders practice of Daitō-ryū Aiki-jūjutsu, and that they share the same Chinese characters, despite  being pronounced "ai" in Japanese and "hap" in Korean, has proved problematic in promoting hapkido internationally as a discipline with its own set of unique characteristics differing from those common to Japanese martial arts.

History and major figures from Korea 
The birth of modern hapkido can be traced to the efforts of a group of Korean nationals in the post-Japanese colonial period of Korea, Choi Yong-Sool (최용술) (1904–1986) and his most prominent students; Chinil Chang, his personally chosen successor, Seo Bok-Seob, the first student of the art; Ji Han-Jae (born 1936), one of the earliest promoters of the art; Kim Moo-Hong, a major innovator; Myung Jae-Nam, a connector between the art of hapkido and aikido, Myung Kwang-Sik the historian and ambassador, all of whom were direct students of Choi or of his immediate students.

Choi Yong-Sool 

Choi Yong-Sool (최용술)'s  training in martial arts is a subject of contention. It is known that Choi was sent to Japan as a young boy and returned to Korea with techniques characteristic of Daitō-ryū Aiki-jūjutsu, a forerunner of aikido.

The subsequent history is quite controversial in Daitō-ryū circles but is claimed by many contemporary hapkido-ists and is attributed to Choi in an interview that took place during a trip Choi made to the United States in 1980 to visit his direct lineage successor Chin il Chang in New York City. In the interview with Chin Il Chang, Choi claimed to have been adopted by Takeda Sōkaku when he was 11 years old and to have been given the Japanese name, Yoshida Asao. He claims to have been taken to Takeda's home and dojo in Akita on Shin Shu mountain where he lived and trained with the master for 30 years. The interview also asserts that he travelled with him as a teaching assistant, that he was employed to catch war deserters and that he was the only student to have a complete understanding of the system taught by Takeda.

This is contradicted by other claims asserting that Choi was simply a worker in the home of Takeda. The meticulous enrollment and fee records of Tokimune Takeda, Takeda's eldest son and Daitō-ryū's successor, do not seem to include Choi's name among them. Therefore, except for claims made by Choi himself, there is little evidence that Choi was the adopted son of Takeda. Kondo Katsuyuki (current head of the mainline Daito Ryu) has however released a page from Takeda Sokaku's eimeiroku that contains Choi Yong Sul's name.

Stanley Pranin, then of Aiki News and now editor of the Aikidojournal.com, asked Kisshomaru Ueshiba about Choi Yong-Sool and hapkido:

While Kondo Katsuyuki has released documentation from Takeda Sokaku's eimeiroku that confirms that Choi Yong Sul did in fact study with him for a short time, some scholars believe it is likely that Choi received most of his training in Daito Ryu from Yoshida Kotaro.

Choi Yong-Sool's first student, and the man whom some claim helped him develop the art of hapkido was Seo Bok-Seob, a Korean judo black belt when they met. Some of Choi's other respected senior students are: Chinil Chang, Lim Hyun-Soo, Ji Han-Jae, Chung Kee Tae, Kim Moo-Hong, and arguably Suh In-Hyuk and Lee Joo-Bang who went on to form the arts of Kuk Sool Won and modern Hwa Rang Do respectively (though some argue that their training stems from time spent training under Kim Moo-Hong).

Chang (Jang) In Mok  
Grand Patriarch Jang In Mok (born 1912.08.15) of Taegue City, who also trained under Takeda Sokaku's linage, returned to Taegue City, Korea in 1945, like Grand Patriarch Choi Yong-Sul. He was a doctor of oriental medicine and taught his Aikijitsu as Hapkido. Dr Jang-in Mok learned the Dae Dong Ryu Yu Sul Hapkido from his teacher Masuta Yutaka and his teacher Takeda Sokaku in Japan. Choi Yong-sool trained many students, but Jang In Mok only trained a few. He had notable students such as Han-young Choi (Chun Ki Do), Jang Seeung Ho, Song Joon Hwi, Hu Il Wong (teacher of Peter and Joseph Kim), and Song Il Hun. The Dae Don Ryu Sul system was introduced to Korea in 1960 by him. The first time he learned martial arts was in Japan, where he learned Daito-ryu Jujisu in September 1928. He received his certificate in 1935 from Masuta Yutaka, a student of Takeda Sodaku.

Han-young Choi  
 Kwang Jang Nim Han-young Choi was born in Kyongkido, Korea December 11, 1935. He began his formal martial arts training at the age of four, instructed by his father (Chun-san Choi) and his uncle (Man-san Choi), in 1939 to learn his family's martial arts system, a system based on stepping, spinning, and jumping. 
The founder of Chun Ki Do Hapkido Grand Master Han-young Choi learned also Taekwondo Mudokwan under Grandmaster Hwang Kee Hwang Ki and was also a top student and pioneer of Taekwondo in Korea. Choi, Han Young Choi, was the first student of Dr. Chang In Mok's Dae Dong Ryu Yu Sul system in Seoul. His martial arts are based on stepping techniques (triangle step, cross step, skip step), turning and jumping. His early years of formal training at a Buddhist monastery in Kyongi do, where he learned meditation, breathing, and application into the physical world. Hounslow (developed into modern Hapkido)- joint manipulation from Grandmaster Chang In Mok. Grandmaster Chang has the same training and lineage as Grandmaster Choi Yong Sul...both brought what we know as Hapkido to Korea from Japan, except Grandmaster Choi commercialized it and Grandmaster Chang did not. Grandmaster Chang focused on oriental medicine and acupuncture. He Choi learned acupuncture and pressure points from him.
Before he founded the World Chun Ki Association, he belonged to the Daehan Hapkido association and Kuk Sool Won Association. One of his best friends was Suh In Hyuk's older brother, and he asked Grandmaster Choi to help spread Kuk Sool Won in Seoul. In the old days, their spread martial arts by fighting the owner of the neighbourhood schools. Then taking them over and changing the names and techniques. One school at a time, he went neighbourhood by neighbourhood, fighting school owners and taking over schools in the name of Kuk Sool Won. Then he moved to the U.S. and after getting fed up with the politics of Daehan and Kuk Sool Won, he quit and founded the World Chun Ki Do Association.

Choi, Han Young, was also a pioneer of the Taekwondo Han Moo Kwan system. He held the number one Black Belt certificate from the Han Moo Kwan. Choi, after he had studied for three years under Dr. Chang In Mok, moved to Seoul and began to teach Dae Dong Ryu Yu Sul. But he joined the Kuk Sool organization and taught Dae Dong Ryu Sul under the Kuk Sool name. One of his best friends was Suh In Hyuk's older brother, and he asked Choi to help spread Kuk Sool Won in Seoul. He also has been belonged to the Daehan Hapkido association. In 1972, Choi Han Young immigrated to the United States and moved to El Paso, Texas. He created his own system called Choi's Martial Arts, and later in the 90s, he renamed it to Chun Ki (Heavenly Power). It was his ambition to acquire do so that Chun Ki Do become accepted as a new style, and he achieves tenth-degree black belt status. Grandmaster's goal was to develop his own martial art to reach the 10th-degree black belt. So Chun Ki was born It took a long time and a lot of work to add the long-dreamed-of Do, and Chun Ki Do gain worldwide recognition in the true line of Hapkido. As a new style in the colour Hapkido world as its own style, Grand Master Han-young Choi was awarded the title of Grand Patriarch, the founder of Chun Ki Do Hapkido. He has trained over 50,000 students in Asia, Europe, and America and is respected by many as one of the few remaining original Hapkido Grandmasters. His belt examination program is methodical and didactically structured, all techniques are explained in simple steps and easy for everyone to understand. With his 15 hand levers, his bring techniques to the man are unique in martial arts. A few of the notable students were: His son Sam Choi, Daniel Ray Walker, and Roman Nikolaus Urban who founded the Chun Ki Do Association in Africa and Europe, Jaeshin Cho his Nephew and Gregory Jump His first Top-student.

Seo Bok-Seob 

Choi's first student and the first person known to have opened up a dojang under Choi was Seo Bok-Seob (서복섭, also spelled Suh Bok-Sup).

In 1948, when Seo Bok-sub was still in his early 20s, he had already earned his black belt in judo and was a graduate of Korea University. After watching Choi Yong-Sool successfully defend himself against a group of men when an argument erupted in the yard of the Seo Brewery Company, Seo who was son of the chairman of the company, invited Choi to begin teaching martial arts to him and some workers at the distillery where he had prepared a dojang.

In 1951, Seo opened up the first proper dojang called the "Daehan Hapki Yukwonsool Dojang (대한합기유권술도장)". Seo also incorporated many of judo´s throws and ground work techniques to the teachings of master Choi. The first symbol for hapkido was designed by Seo, which was used to denote the art was the inverted arrowhead design featured in both the modern incarnation of the KiDo Association and by Myung Kwang-Sik's World Hapkido Federation. Choi Yong-Sool was also employed during this time as a bodyguard to Seo's father who was a congressman. Seo and Choi agreed to shorten the name of the art from 'hapki yu kwon sool' to 'hapkido' in 1959.

Ji Han-Jae

Ji Han-Jae (지한재) was undoubtedly the prime mover in the art of Korean hapkido. It is due to his physical skills, technical contributions, promotional efforts and political connections as head hapkido instructor to the presidential body guard under Korean President Park Chung-hee that hapkido became popularized, first within Korea and then internationally.

If the martial art education of Choi Yong-Sool is unconfirmed, the same must be said for martial art history of Ji Han-Jae's training, apart from his time as a student of Choi. Ji was an early student (Dan #14) of Choi. He details that prior to opening his martial art school in Seoul, the Sung Moo Kwan (성무관), he also supposedly studied from a man known as 'Taoist Lee' and an old woman he knew as 'Grandma'.

As a teacher of hapkido, Ji incorporated traditional Korean kicking techniques (from Taoist Lee and the art Sam Rang Do Tek Gi) and punching techniques into the system and gave the resulting synthesis the name hapkido in 1957.

Although a founding member of the Korea Kido Association (대한기도회) in 1963 with Choi Yong-Sool as titular Chairman and Kim Jeong-Yoon as Secretary General and Head Instructor for the association, Ji found himself not able to exert as much control over the organization as he might have wished. To this end and with the support of the Head of the Security Forces, Park Jong-Kyu, Ji founded the very successful Korea Hapkido Association (대한 합기도 협회) in 1965.

Later, when this organization combined with the organizations founded by Myung Jae-Nam (Korea Hapki Association/한국 합기회) and Kim Moo-Hong (Korean Hapkido Association/한국 합기도 협회) in 1973, they became the very extensive and influential organization known as the Republic of Korea Hapkido Association (대한민국 합기도 협회).

In 1984, after being released from prison for fraud, Ji moved first to Germany and then to the United States, and founded Sin Moo Hapkido (신무 합기도), which incorporates philosophical tenets, a specific series of techniques (including kicks) and healing techniques into the art. Three of Ji Han-Jae's notable students in Korea were Kwon Tae-Man (권태만), Myung Jae-Nam (명재남) and Chang Young Shil (장영실) who is the current president of the International Hapkido Federation. Ji can be seen in the films Lady Kung-fu and Game of Death in which he takes part in a long fight scene against Bruce Lee.

After the death of Choi Yong-Sool in 1986, Ji came forward with the assertion that it was he who founded the Korean art of hapkido, asserting that Choi Yong-Sool taught only yawara based skills and that it was he who added much of the kicking and weapon techniques we now associate with modern hapkido. The reality being that Grandmaster Choi Yong-Sool taught him little of the original art and higher level techniques so he fabricated a new system on his own terms. He also asserted that it was he who first used the term 'hapkido' to refer to the art. While both claims are contested by some of the other senior teachers of the art, what is not contested is the undeniably huge contributions made by Ji to the art, its systematization and its promotion worldwide.

Chang Chin Il

A direct student of Choi, Chin Il Chang(장진일) inherited the title of Doju in Choi's personal and complete system of Hapkido on January 15, 1985, becoming the second direct lineage Grandmaster.

On April 5, 1985, Choi personally awarded Chang with the title of Doju (Keeper of the way). Chang also had the privilege and honor of being the first Hapkido master awarded the 9th Dan certificate by Choi in 1980.

A large inauguration ceremony followed on April 11, 1985. The historic event was covered and documented by Korea Sports News and MBC Korean Television. Choi Young-sool, Chang, and Choi's son, the late Choi Bok-Yeol, were in attendance. Choi left the full documentation and recordings of the system to Chang, who continued to research and document the full history and development of Hapkido.

Furthermore, the future Grandmaster, who was a personally trained, closed-door disciple of Choi, was given Letter of Appointment certificates, the second dated December 1, 1977, and the third dated March 5, 1980. This gave Chang more progressive power and authority in Choi's Hapkido Association. These specific certificates, along with his 9th Dan ranking in 1980, and Doju title in 1985, amply demonstrate that Choi was grooming Chang to be the future Grandmaster of Hapkido.

Chang's intimate video interview(one of several over decades) with his teacher Doju Choi during his visit to New York City has been abused through numerous interpretations and translations. Some have even claimed erroneously to have conducted the interview themselves, further clouding and distorting the truth and gravity inherent in the interview. These endless distortions were generally rebutted in various media each time they appeared.

Doju Chang continues to teach in New York City after decades of maintaining a commercial school, as well as a stint teaching Hapkido at the United Nations. He currently teaches a small group in NYC dedicated to the preservation of Hapkido. Many detractors have spread endless conjecture about him. One lineage created further controversy by stating Choi passed the system to his only son, Choi Bok-Yeol, which is incorrect, misleading, and insulting to the legacy and wishes of Choi. Black Belt Magazine, respecting Chin Il Chang as the second lineage successor, asked him to write a brief obituary on Choi that appeared in the April 1987 issue.

Doju Chang died peacefully in his sleep on February 23, 2018, at the age of 77 as a result of Hypertensive Cardiovascular Disease.

Kim Moo-Hong 

(alternately rendered as Kim Moo-Woong or Kim Mu-Hyun)

A student from the Choi and Seo's Daehan Hapki Yukwonsool Dojang, was Kim Moo-Hong (김무홍), who later taught at Seo's main dojang in Taegu. Seo, who promoted Kim to 4th degree, credits Kim with the development of many kicks which are still used in hapkido today. Kim apparentally took the concepts from very basic kicks he had learned from Choi and went to a temple to work on developing them to a much greater degree. Later, in 1961, Kim travelled to Seoul and while staying at Ji Han-Jae's Sung Moo Kwan dojang they finalized the kicking curriculum.

Kim went on to found his Shin Moo Kwan dojang (신무관) in the Jongmyo section of Seoul, also in 1961. Won Kwang-Hwa (원광화) and Kim Jung-Soo(김정수) also served as instructors at this dojang. Kim's notable students were Lee Han-Cheol (이한철), Kim Woo-Tak (김우탁; who founded the Kuk Sool Kwan Hapkido dojang), Huh Il-Woong (허일웅), Lee Joo-Bang (이주방; who founded modern Hwa Rang Do), Na Han-Dong (나한동), Shin Dong-Ki (신동기) and Seo In-Hyuk (서인혁; who founded Kuk Sool Won).

Originally a member of the Korea Kido Association, the organization sent Kim to teach hapkido in the United States in 1969. Upon returning to Korea in 1970, Kim looked to Ji Han-Jae's move to set up his own organization and with the encouragement of his students followed suit and founded the Korean Hapkido Association in 1971. Later he combined this organization with the groups led by Ji Han-Jae and Myung Jae-Nam to form the Republic of Korea Hapkido Association.

Lim Hyun-Soo 

Lim, Hyun Soo was born in Gue-Chang Kyungnam Province in Korea on Sept. 7, 1944.  In 1965 he visited Hapkido Founder Choi, Yong Sool and had his first meeting with Hapkido. In 1965, he began his training in Hapkido by Master Kim, Yeung Jae, the chief master at Choi Yong-Sul's dojang. From 1978, Lim attained all of his rank and training directly from Choi Dojunim. During his time training in Hapkido, he endured strict and intense training. With Founder Choi's blessing, he opened the Jung Ki Kwan on October 24, 1974.  In 1976 Founder Choi retired and closed his dojang, joined the Jung Ki Kwan, though he retired actively from public teaching. Founder Choi privately taught Lim during his visits. Founder Choi would also spend his days at the Jung Ki Kwan playing Baduk (Chinese chess) with Lim.  It was during these times, Lim would further inquire to Founder Choi about various Hapkido techniques.  Lim has the Jung Ki Kwan headquarters in Daegu City. He was promoted to 9th dan by Hapkido Founder, Choi, Yong Sool.   He is an accomplished swordsman and created Chung Suk Kuhapdo after studying and investigating numerous sword styles in Japan and South Korea..  Choi Yong-Sul told Lim Hyun Soo that learning the sword would be an essential component to his Hapkido training and approved of Lim's sword training. Lim attends the Jung Ki Kwan daily teaching students inside Korea and from around the world.  Since 1996, he has visited the U.S. for seminars numerous times. In addition, he has visited Europe such as the Sweden and the Netherlands for Hapkido and Chung Suk Kuhapdo seminars.

Han Bong-Soo 

(alternately rendered as Bong Soo Han)

Han Bong-Soo (한봉수) began his training in Hapkido after seeing a demonstration put on by the founder, Yong Sul Choi. From then on, he committed himself to Hapkido training under Choi and other teachers, but never received any direct high ranking from Choi himself. Han was one of the world's foremost practitioners of Hapkido, and is referred to as the Father of his own offshoot of modern Hapkido in the Western World. He led a dedicated effort in the development of his own version of Hapkido. He taught thousands of loyal students throughout his life with many becoming masters themselves. Other masters across all styles have sought out his wisdom and teachings.

In 1967, Han emigrated to the United States of America, first staying with and teaching at his friend S. O. Choi's hapkido school in California. Han later opened his own school in Los Angeles in 1968. His early years were difficult and he worked in a factory during the day while he taught at a struggling hapkido school in the evening located in an economically depressed area. Later, he relocated his school to the Pacific Palisades area in an effort to be closer to Hollywood and the movie industry.

On July 4, 1969, Han Bong Soo was giving a demonstration of Hapkido at a park in Pacific Palisades, California. In the audience was Tom Laughlin. After a spectacular demonstration, Laughlin approached Han about being involved in a movie project called Billy Jack. Han gained critical acclaim for staging and performing some of the most realistic martial arts fight sequences in a film. Before Billy Jack, movies contained at most brief references to martial arts, with fights portrayed by actors who had little training. With Billy Jack, Han introduced authentic hapkido techniques to Western audiences. In its sequel, The Trial of Billy Jack, he received a co-starring part where he spoke about and demonstrated the art, mentioning the art by name for the first time.

Han studied and refined this Korean martial art for more than 60 years. He was not a direct high level student of Grandmaster Yong Sul Choi but created and crafted his own limited version from various other teachers that he expanded and taught throughout the world.

Kim Jung-Soo
Kim Jung-Soo (김정수) was born and raised in the Taegu area, Korea, and started training Hapkido directly under Choi Yong-Sool (최용술) in 1957. He was one of the earlier students of Hapkido, and one source puts him as the eight original student of Choi Yong-Sool. Kim Jung-Soo trained sporadically under Choi Yong-Sool (최용술) along with his primary teachers and influencers Kim Moo-Hong (김무홍) and Won Kwang-Wha (원광화) from 1957 until  1986.

In 1961, Kim Moo-Hong (김무홍) moved to Seoul to open a dojang, and Kim Jung-Soo (김정수) and Won Kwang-Wha (원광화) went with him and became his dojang's primary instructors. Together, they developed the Shin Moo Kwan(신무관) branch of Hapkido. In 1963 Kim Jung-Soo (김정수) decided to go his own way and opened his own dojang in Taegu under the banner of Yun Bee Kwan (윤비관). Later, his students began opening branch schools throughout the greater Taegu aerea, under various names, but still considered to be part of the Yun Bee Kwan (윤비관) family. These schools are known to hold tightly to the original teachings of Choi, Yong Sool (김정수), while also including most of the refinements done by Kim Moo-Hong (김무홍) in terms of kicking methods.

Kim Jung-Soo (김정수) is mostly known for being the founder and president of the Korea-based World Hapkido General Federation, also known as World Hapkido Federation, collecting most of the schools under the Yun Bee Kwan(윤비관) linage in one federation. This organization has since expanded worldwide. While having a similar name, this organization is not to be confused with the U.S. based World Hapkido Federation founded by Kwang Sik Myung (광시숭).

Kim Jung-Soo is currently teaching from his dojang in Taegu City, South Korea.

Myung Jae-Nam 

In 1972, Myung Jae-Nam (명재남) was one of the original members of the Korea Hapkido Association(대한 합기도 협회), which was formed in 1965 at the request of the South Korean President Park Jeong-Hee. The Korea Hapkido Association was formed with the assistance of Park Jong Kyu, who was the head of the Presidential Protective Forces and one of the most powerful men in Korea at the time.

Myung Jae Nam exchanged martial art techniques and information with an Aikido practitioner named Hirata in 1965, for a period of about four years and included many aikido-like techniques into his version of hapkido. He has produced Several books and videos on the subject of hapkido self-defense. Later Myung Jae-Nam broke away from all the other organizations and started to focus on promoting a new style, hankido. Until his death in 1999 he was the leader of the International Hapkido Federation.

Lee Chong-Min 
Chong Min Lee was born and raised in Seoul, Korea. He began his study of Hapkido as a teenager and continued studying Hapkido throughout his life though not a direct student of the late Grandmaster Yong Sool Choi. He is a self-promoted 9th Degree Black Belt, the Master Instructor of Hapkido Center, President of The World Hapkido Association.

Lee served as an Instructor with the 1st Special Forces Group in the Korean Army, and has taught martial arts to the Police Departments in Seoul as well as Plainfield, New Jersey. He has also served as the director of Hapkido demonstrations for such dignitaries as Hubert H. Humphrey and the Chancellor of the Republic of China, Mr. Chang, during their visits to Seoul, Korea. Lee came to the United States in June 1980. He currently operates a Hapkido Center in Warren, New Jersey, and is also a member of the Law Enforcement Officers Association New Jersey State. He has been instructing students for over 42 years in Hapkido.

Kim Myung-Yong 
Kim Myung-Yong was born in Korea in 1942. He started at the age of 17 training at Seung Moo Kwan School under Grandmaster Ji Han-Jae.  He was a Hapkido instructor in the military camp of Wang Shim Ri. His style of Hapkido Jin Jung Kwan has locations all over the world and is one of the largest Hapkido styles practiced.  He is now retired in Houston, TX. In 2012 Gm Kim appointed Michael Rhoades as Vice President and 8th dan as well as assigning him his Korean name Kim Tae-Hun. In 2018 Gm Kim appointed Gm Rhoades as President and 9th dan of Jin Jung Kwan.

Kim Yun-Sik

Kim Yun-Sik (김윤식)was born in Seoul, Korea in 1943. He is the founder of Bum Moo Kwan Hapkido. He began his martial arts training in 1954 under the direction of Choi Yong-Sool, and received the black belt from Choi in 1957.
In the same year he received the black belt in Tang Soo Do from Grandmaster Hwang Kee.

Kim is the founder of the Bum Moo Kwan style, in which the practitioner is instructed to finish the encounter quickly, using any available material as weapon or any part of his body, aiming the opponent's pressure or vital points. Bum Moo is one of the three original and government regulated Hapkido Kwans.
Residing, teaching and training in Brazil since 1977, Kim was the master of several Hapkido World Champions, such as Norberto Serrano Jr., Rafael Tercarolli and Leandro Heck Gemeo

Lim Chae-Kwan

Grandmaster Lim Chae-Kwan is the Founder of Jin Mu Kwan.
The Jin Mu Kwan is a traditional art of hapkido. 
JIN- Authentic, true.
MU- Martial 
KWAN- School or training hall.

This school was founded by Grandmaster Lim Chae-Kwan in 2007 after many years of research and study into the Hapkido of Founder Choi Young-Sul.  As a high school student, Lim, Chea-Kwan began his Hapkido training under Grand Master Lim, Hyun-Soo. Through the courtesy of his teacher at that time Grand Master Lim, Hyun-Soo, president of the Jung Ki-Kwan, he obtained a 4th dan certificate signed by Founder Choi Yong-Sul. Since Choi's death in 1986 GM Lim studied with the top students of Founder Choi.  Some of these Grandmasters were GM Jun Jeong-Pil (kicking),GM Lee Jae-Young (advanced wrist technology), GM Lee Young-Hee (clothing grab defense), GM Chae Hung-Jun (special offensive techniques for joint locking and throwing), GM Kim Yeong-Jae (special self-protection techniques).

GM Lim Chae-Kwan after studying Founder Choi's Hapkido style and feeling his very high level martial arts has studied diligently his whole life to become a skilled craftsman in Hapkido.

Principles 

On the "hard-soft" scale of martial arts, hapkido stands somewhere in the middle, employing "soft" techniques similar to jujutsu and aikido as well as "hard" techniques reminiscent of taekwondo and tang soo do. Even the "hard" techniques, though, emphasize circular rather than linear movements. Hapkido is an eclectic, hybrid martial art, and different hapkido schools emphasize different techniques. However, some core techniques are found in each school (kwan), and all techniques should follow the three principles of hapkido:
 Harmony or blending principle
 Circle principle
 Flowing or water principle

Hwa, or harmony, is simply the act of remaining relaxed and not directly opposing an opponent's force. For example, if an opponent were to push against a hapkido student's chest, rather than resist and push back, the hapkido student would blend with the opponent, avoiding any direct confrontation by moving in the same direction as the push and utilizing the opponent's forward momentum to execute a throw.

Won, the circle principle, is a way to gain momentum for executing the techniques in a natural and free-flowing manner. If an opponent attacks in a linear motion, as in a punch or knife thrust, the hapkido student would redirect the opponent's force by leading the attack in a circular pattern, thereby adding the attacker's power to his own. Once he has redirected that power, the hapkido student can execute any of a variety of techniques to incapacitate his attacker. The hapkido practitioner learns to view an attacker as an "energy entity" rather than as a physical entity. The bigger the person is, the more energy a person has, the better it is for the hapkido student.

Yu, the water principle, is analogous to the concept of a "moving target" wherein the saying, "In regards to a stream, you can't step on the same water twice," the current forever moves the water downstream and that persistent flow can erode away just about anything, even a boulder, which is often perceived as a substance that's "stronger" than water.

Hapkido is fluid and does not rely on brute force against force. Rather it is much like water as an adaptable entity, in that a hapkido master will attempt to deflect an opponent's strike in a way that is similar to free-flowing water being divided around a stone, only to return and envelop it.

Techniques 
Hapkido seeks to be a fully comprehensive fighting style and as such tries to avoid narrow specialization in any particular type of technique or range of fighting. It maintains a wide range of tactics for striking, standing joint locks, throwing techniques (both pure and joint manipulating throws) and pinning techniques. Some styles also incorporate tactics for ground fighting although these tactics generally tend to be focused upon escaping and regaining footing or controlling, striking, and finishing a downed opponent, rather than lengthy wrestling or submission grappling engagements.

The Korean term for technique is sool. As terminology varies between schools, some refer to defensive maneuvers as soolgi (술기; loosely translated as "technique-ing"), while hoshinsool (meaning "self-defense") is preferred by others.

Proper hapkido tactics include using footwork and a series of kicks and hand strikes to bridge the distance with an opponent. Then to immediately control the balance of the opponent (typically by manipulating the head and neck), for a take down or to isolate a wrist or arm and apply a joint twisting throw, depending upon the situation; Hapkido is a comprehensive system and once the opponent's balance has been taken, there are a myriad of techniques to disable and subdue the opponent.

Hapkido makes use of pressure points known in Korean as hyeol which are also used in traditional Asian medical practices such as acupuncture point. These pressure points are either struck to produce unconsciousness or manipulated to create pain allowing one to more easily upset the balance of one's opponent prior to a throw or joint manipulation.

Hapkido emphasizes self-defense over sport fighting and as such employs the use of weapons, including environmental weapons of opportunity, in addition to empty hand techniques. Some schools also teach hyeong, the Korean equivalent of what is commonly known as "kata" (or "forms") in Japanese martial arts.

Kicking 

The wide variety of kicks in hapkido make it distinctly Korean. Taekwondo kicks appear to be similar to many of the kicks found in hapkido, though again circular motion is emphasized. Also, in contrast to most modern taekwondo styles, hapkido utilises a wide variety of low (below the waist), hooking or sweeping kicks, with one of the most distinctive being the low spinning (sweeping) heel kick.

Hapkido's method of delivery tends toward greater weight commitment to the strikes and less concern for quick retraction of the kicking leg. Traditionally, Choi Yong-Sool's yu kwon sool kicking techniques were only to the lower body, but most derived varieties of hapkido, probably as a direct influence from other Korean arts, also include high kicks and jumping kicks. At the more advanced levels of Hapkido the practitioner learns "blade kicks" which utilize sweeping blade strikes of the inner and outer foot against pressure points of the body.

Two of the earliest innovators in this regard were Ji Han-Jae and Kim Moo-Hong, both of whom were exposed to what were thought to be indigenous Korean kicking arts. They combined these forms together with the yu sool concepts for striking taught to them by Choi and during a period of 8 months training together in 1961 finalized the kicking curriculum which would be used by the Korea Hapkido Association for many years to come.

Other influences also were exerted on the kicking techniques of important hapkido teachers. Kwon Tae-Man (권태만) initially studied under Ji Han-Jae before immigrating to southern California in the United States. Han Bong-soo studied under Gwonbeop and Shūdōkan karate from Yoon Byung-In (윤병인), whose students were influential in the later forming of Kong Soo Do and Taekwondo styles, specifically the Chang Moo Kwan and Jidokwan. He, like Kim Moo-Hong, also trained briefly in the Korean art of Taekkyon under Lee Bok-Yong (이복용).

Many other teachers like Myung Kwang-Sik (명광식), Jeong Kee-Tae (정기태), Lim Hyun-Soo (임현수), and many others trained in tang soo do and kong soo do, Shotokan and Shūdōkan karate based systems which predated and influenced the forming of first tae soo do and later modern taekwondo styles.

Kim Sang-Cook states that while many of the original yu kwon sool students were exposed to many different contemporary Korean arts the Chung Do Kwan was of particular importance in the transition from the original jujutsu based form to what we know today as modern hapkido.

Most forms of hapkido include a series of double kicks used to promote balance, coordination and muscular control.

 An example of a double kick set
 Front Kick 
 Side Kick
 Front Kick 
 Back Kick ("Turning back-side Kick")
 Front Kick 
 Roundhouse Kick
 Front Heel/Hook Kick
 Roundhouse Kick
 Inverted Low Side Kick
 High Side Kick
 Inside Crescent Kick/Outside Crescent Kick (or Heeldown/Axe-Kick for both)
 Side Kick (or Inside Heeldown Kick and Side Kick)
 Outside Heel-down Kick
 Roundhouse Kick
 Ankle Scoop Kick 
 Side Kick
 Cover Kick 
 Front Kick
 Inside Heel Hooking-the-Thigh kick
 Front Kick
 High Spinning Heel Kick
 Low Spinning Heel Kick
 Inside Footblade Kick 
 Outside Footblade Kick
 Outside Heeldown Kick 
 Roundhouse

After these kicks are mastered using one foot kick the student moves on to jumping versions using alternate kicking legs.

Kim Chong Sung (김종성, Jang Mu Won Hapkido Founder), was one of the oldest living active hapkido instructors, maintains that the source of these kicking methods is from the indigenous Korean kicking art of Taekkyon. Others feel that these kicks are more representative of kong soo do and tang soo do styles which emerged from an adaptation of Japanese karate forms.

Hand strikes 
Like most martial arts, hapkido employs a great number of punches and hand strikes, as well as elbow strikes. A distinctive example of hapkido hand techniques is "live hand" strike that focuses energy to the baek hwa hyul in the hand, producing energy strikes and internal strikes. The hand strikes are often used to weaken the opponent before joint locking and throwing, and also as finishing techniques.

Hand striking in hapkido (unless in competition) is not restricted to punches and open hand striking; some significance is given to striking with fingernails at the throat and eyes; pulling at the opponent's genitals is also covered in conventional training.

In order to recall hand strikes more easily in an emotionally charged situation, beginning students are taught conventional, effective patterns of blocks and counter-attacks called makko chigi (막고 치기), which progress to more complex techniques as the student becomes familiar with them.

Joint manipulation techniques 

Many of hapkido's joint control techniques are said to be derived largely from Daitō-ryū Aiki-jūjutsu. They are taught similarly to Aikido and Ju Jutsu techniques, but in general the circles are smaller and the techniques are applied in a more linear fashion. Hapkido's joint manipulation techniques attack both large joints (such as the elbow, shoulder, neck, back, knee, and hip) and small joints (such as wrists, fingers, ankles, toes, and jaw).

Most techniques involve applying force in the direction that a joint moves naturally and then forcing it to overextend or by forcing a joint to move in a direction that goes against its natural range of motion. These techniques can be used to cause pain and force a submission, to gain control of an opponent for 'come along' techniques (as is often employed in law enforcement), to assist in a hard or gentle throw or to cause the dislocation or breaking of the joint. Hapkido differs from some post-war styles of Aikido in its preservation of a great many techniques which are applied against the joint that were deemed by some to be inconsistent with Aikido's more pacifistic philosophy.

 Wristlocks
Hapkido is well known for its use of a wide variety of wristlocks. These techniques are believed to have been derived from Daitō-ryū Aiki-jūjutsu although their manner of performance is not always identical to that of the parent art. Still many of the techniques found in hapkido are quite similar to those of Daito-ryu and of Aikido, which was derived from that art. Examples of such techniques are: the supinating wristlock, pronating wristlock, internal rotational wristlock, and the utilization of pressure points on the wrist. These techniques are common to many forms of Japanese Jujutsu, Chinese chin na, and even "catch as catch can" wrestling.

 Elbowlocks
Although well known for its wristlocking techniques, Hapkido has an equally wide array of tactics which center upon the manipulation of the elbow joint (see armlock). The first self-defense technique typically taught in many hapkido schools is the knife-hand elbow press. This technique is thought to be derived from Daitō-ryū's ippondori, a method of disarming and destroying the elbow joint of a sword-wielding opponent. Hapkido typically introduces this technique off a wrist-grabbing attack where the defender makes a circular movement with his hands to free himself from the opponent's grasp and applies a pronating wristlock while cutting down upon the elbow joint with their forearm, taking their opponent down to the ground, where an elbow lock is applied with one's hand or knee to immobilize the attacker in a pin. Both Daito-ryu and Aikido prefer to use hand pressure on the elbow throughout the technique rather than using the forearm as a "hand blade", cutting into the elbow joint, in the Hapkido manner.

Throwing techniques 

In addition to throws which are achieved by unbalancing one's opponent through the twisting of their joints, hapkido also contains techniques of pure throwing which do not require the assistance of jointlocks. Some of these techniques are found within Daito-ryu but a great many of them are held in common with judo (pronounced "yudo 유도" in Korean). Many of early practitioners of hapkido had extensive judo backgrounds including Choi Yong-Sool's first student Seo Bok-Seob.

Judo techniques were introduced in the early years of the 20th century in Korea during the Japanese colonial period. Judo/Yudo tactics employ extensive use of throws, various chokes, hold downs, joint locks, and other grappling techniques used to control the opponent on the ground. It is believed that these techniques were absorbed into the hapkido curriculum from judo as there were a great many judo practitioners in Korea at that time and its tactics were commonly employed in the fighting of the period. Indeed, there also exists a portion of the hapkido curriculum which consists of techniques specifically designed to thwart judo style attacks.

The judo/yudo techniques were however adopted with adjustments made to make them blend more completely with the self-defence orientation which hapkido stresses. For example, many of the judo style throwing techniques employed in hapkido do not rely upon the use of traditional judo grips on the uniform, which can play a large role in the Japanese sport. Instead in many cases they rely upon gripping the limbs, head or neck in order to be successful.

Even today Korea remains one of the strongest countries in the world for the sport of judo and this cross influence on the art of Korean hapkido to be felt in Hapkido influenced styles such as GongKwon Yusul (공권유술).

Weapons 
As a hapkido student advances through the various belt levels (essentially the same as other Korean arts, e.g. taekwondo), he or she learns how to employ and defend against various weapons. The first weapon encountered is most often a knife. Another initial weapon used to teach both control and the basic precepts of utilizing a weapon with Hapkido techniques is the Jung Bong (police baton sized stick), techniques and defenses against the 35 cm short stick, a walking stick or cane (ji-pang-ee; 지팡이), and a rope are introduced in hapkido training. Many hapkido organisations may also include other weapons training such as a sword (gum; 검), long staff, middle length staff, nunchaku, war-fan or other types of bladed weapons such as twin short swords. Some schools even teach students to defend against firearms. Hapkido weapons techniques are often incorporated into many military and law enforcement training curricula.

Training 
Hapkido training takes place in a dojang. While training methods vary, a typical training session will contain technique practice (striking techniques as well as defensive throws and grappling), break falling, sparring, meditation and exercises to develop internal energy (ki).

Hapkido is predominantly a "soft" art, but this does not mean that it is easier on the opponent, or that training is easier (see Hard and soft (martial arts)). Hapkido training is vigorous and demanding. The practitioner could benefit in training by being lean and muscular. However, strength is not a prerequisite of hapkido; what strength and fitness is necessary to perform the techniques develops naturally as a result of training.

Example Curriculum

The following is an example of the Korea Hapkido Association technical requirements from 1st degree to 5th degree Black Belt as recorded by He-Young Kimm in 1991, created in association with Ji Han-Jae. These techniques are now considered pre-dan level.

1st Degree Black Belt
 Single Kicks
 Wrist Seize Defense
 Clothing Seize Defense
 Punch Defense
 Kick Defense
 Combination Kicks
 Jumping Kicks
 Throw Defense
 Knife Defense
 Attacking Techniques / Taking the Initiative

2nd Degree Black Belt
 Advanced Wrist Grab Defense
 Advanced Clothing Grab Defense
 Advanced Punch Defense
 Advanced Kick Defense
 Choke Defense
 Advanced Attacking Techniques / Taking the Initiative
 Special Kicks
 Defense From A Sitting Or Lying Posture

3rd Degree Black Belt
 Joint locking Counters
 Short Stick Techniques
 Staff Techniques

4th Degree Black Belt
 Cane Techniques
 Sword Techniques
 Defense Against Multiple Attackers

5th Degree Black Belt
 Techniques Using Opponent's Force
 Rope Techniques
 Knife Throwing Techniques
 Revival Techniques

See also 
Korean Martial Arts
 Aiki (martial arts principle)
Ju Jutsu

References

Further reading 

 Myung, Kwang-Sik. Korean Hapkido: Ancient Art of Masters. World Hapkido Federation, Los Angeles, California, 1976.
 Myung, Kwang-Sik. Hapkido: Special Self-Protection Techniques. World Hapkido Federation, Los Angeles, California, 1993.
 Myung, Kwang-Sik. Hapkido Textbook (Vol. 1–5). World Hapkido Federation, Los Angeles, California, 2000.
 Kim, He-Young. Hapkido. Andrew Jackson Press, Baton Rouge, Louisiana, 1991.
 Kim, He-Young. Hapkido II. Andrew Jackson Press, Baton Rouge, Louisiana, 1994.
 Kim, He-Young. History of Korea and Hapkido. Andrew Jackson Press, Baton Rouge, Louisiana, 2008.

 
Hybrid martial arts
Korean martial arts